Sangsadia Nirbachan 1996 (Bengali: সংসদীয় নির্বাচন ১৯৯৬), is a military medal of Bangladesh. The medal was established in 1996. The medal is intended for awarding citizens of the country who took part in the organization of general parliamentary elections.

References 

Military awards and decorations of Bangladesh